Evan Hall is a former sugarcane plantation in Donaldsonville, Louisiana, U.S. It was established for the production of sugar by Evan Jones, a merchant and politician, by 1807.

It was later acquired by Henry McCall, a planter from New Orleans, who built a mansion and slave cabins in 1840; McCall owned another plantation in Lafourche Parish, Louisiana.

The remaining two slave cabins have been listed on the National Register of Historic Places since September 20, 1983. Sometime after the listing the northeastern cabin seems to have been demolished or incorporated into a modern building.

References

Notes

See also
National Register of Historic Places listings in Ascension Parish, Louisiana

Slave cabins and quarters in the United States
Houses on the National Register of Historic Places in Louisiana
Houses completed in 1840
Buildings and structures in Ascension Parish, Louisiana
Donaldsonville, Louisiana
Sugar plantations in Louisiana